

Championships

Professional
Men
NBA: San Antonio Spurs over the Detroit Pistons 4-3.  MVP: Tim Duncan
 See also 2004–05 NBA season, 2005 NBA Playoffs, 2005 NBA Finals, 2005 NBA draft, 2005 NBA All-Star Game
EuroBasket 2005: Greece 78, Germany 62
EuroLeague:
Maccabi Tel Aviv defeated TAU Cerámica 90-78 in the final
 Philippine Basketball Association 2004–05 season:
Barangay Ginebra Kings over the Talk N' Text Phone Pals 4-2 in the Philippine Cup Finals
San Miguel Beermen over the Talk N' Text Phone Pals 4-1 in the Fiesta Conference Finals
Women
WNBA: Sacramento Monarchs over the Connecticut Sun 3-1.  MVP: Yolanda Griffith
 see also 2005 WNBA season, 2005 WNBA Playoffs, 2005 WNBA Finals, 2005 WNBA draft, 2005 WNBA All-Star Game
Eurobasket Women: Czech Republic 72, Russia 70

College
Men
 NCAA
NCAA Division I: North Carolina 75, Illinois 70
NIT: South Carolina 60, Saint Joseph's 57
NCAA Division II: Virginia Union 63, Bryant 58
NCAA Division III: Wisconsin–Stevens Point 73, Rochester 49
 NAIA
NAIA Division I John Brown (Ark.) 65, Azusa Pacific (Cal.) 55
NAIA Division II Walsh (Ohio) 81, Concordia (Neb.) 70
Women
 NCAA
NCAA Division I: Baylor 84, Michigan State 62
WNIT: Southwest Missouri State 78, West Virginia 70
NCAA Division II: Washburn 70, Seattle Pacific 53
NCAA Division III: Millikin 70, Randolph-Macon 50
 NAIA
NAIA Division I Union (Tenn.) 67, Oklahoma City 63
NAIA Division II Morningside (Iowa) 75, Cedarville (Ohio) 65
 NJCAA
Division I:   Central Arizona College Coolidge, Ariz. 83, College of Southern Idaho, Twin Falls 50
Division II:  Monroe Community College, N.Y 62,  Illinois Central College, East Peoria, Ill. 46
Division III:  Anoka-Ramsey Community College, Minn 64,  Monroe College, New York 60
 Philippines
 UAAP
 UAAP Men's: FEU Tamaraws over La Salle Green Archers, 2-0
 NCAA Seniors: Letran Knights over PCU Dolphins, 2-1
 UAAP Women's: Ateneo Lady Eagles over Adamson Lady Falcons 2-0
 NCAA Juniors: San Sebastian Staglets over San Beda Red Cubs 2-0
 UAAP Juniors: DLSZ Junior Archers over UPIS Junior Maroons 2-0

Awards and honors

Naismith Memorial Basketball Hall of Fame
Class of 2005:
 Jim Boeheim
 Hubert "Hubie" Brown
 Jim Calhoun
 Sue Gunter
 Hortencia de Fatima Marcari

Women's Basketball Hall of Fame
Class of 2005
 Joe Ciampi
 Kelli Litsch
 Hunter Low
 Edna Tarbutton
 Dixie Woodall
 Lynette Woodard

Professional
Men
NBA Most Valuable Player Award:   Steve Nash
NBA Rookie of the Year Award: Emeka Okafor
NBA Defensive Player of the Year Award: Ben Wallace
FIBA Europe Player of the Year Award: Dirk Nowitzki, Dallas Mavericks and 
Euroscar: Dirk Nowitzki, Dallas Mavericks and 
Mr. Europa: Dirk Nowitzki, Dallas Mavericks and 
Women
WNBA Most Valuable Player Award: Sheryl Swoopes, Houston Comets
WNBA Defensive Player of the Year Award: Tamika Catchings, Indiana Fever
WNBA Rookie of the Year Award: Temeka Johnson, Washington Mystics
WNBA Most Improved Player Award: Nicole Powell, Sacramento Monarchs
Kim Perrot Sportsmanship Award: Taj McWilliams-Franklin, Connecticut Sun
WNBA Coach of the Year Award: John Whisenant, Sacramento Monarchs
WNBA All-Star Game MVP: Sheryl Swoopes, Houston Comets
WNBA Finals Most Valuable Player Award: Yolanda Griffith, Sacramento Monarchs
FIBA Europe Player of the Year Award: Maria Stepanova,  CSKA Samara, Connecticut Sun,  and

Collegiate 
 Combined
Legends of Coaching Award: Jim Calhoun, Connecticut
 Men
John R. Wooden Award: Andrew Bogut, Utah
Naismith College Coach of the Year: Bruce Weber, Illinois
Frances Pomeroy Naismith Award: Nate Robinson, Washington
Associated Press College Basketball Player of the Year: Andrew Bogut, Utah
NCAA basketball tournament Most Outstanding Player: Joakim Noah, Florida
USBWA National Freshman of the Year: Marvin Williams, North Carolina
Associated Press College Basketball Coach of the Year: Tubby Smith, Kentucky
Naismith Outstanding Contribution to Basketball: Everett Case
 Women
John R. Wooden Award: Seimone Augustus, LSU
Naismith College Player of the Year: Seimone Augustus, LSU
Naismith College Coach of the Year: Pokey Chatman, LSU
Wade Trophy: Seimone Augustus, LSU
Frances Pomeroy Naismith Award: Tan White, Mississippi State
Associated Press Women's College Basketball Player of the Year: Seimone Augustus, LSU
NCAA basketball tournament Most Outstanding Player: Sophia Young, Baylor
Basketball Academic All-America Team: Kate Endress, Ball State
Carol Eckman Award: Bonnie Henrickson, Kansas
USBWA National Freshman of the Year: Candice Wiggins, Stanford
USBWA National Freshman of the Year: Tasha Humphrey, Georgia
Associated Press College Basketball Coach of the Year: Joanne P. McCallie, Michigan State
List of Senior CLASS Award women's basketball winners: Kendra Wecker, Kansas State
Nancy Lieberman Award: Temeka Johnson, LSU
Naismith Outstanding Contribution to Basketball: Leon Barmore

Movies
Coach Carter
Rebound (film)

Deaths
 March 17 — Norm Mager, NBA player (Baltimore Bullets) and college champion (CCNY) (born 1926)
 March 19 – Greg Cook, American college player (LSU) (born 1958)
 April 11 — Doug Peden, Canadian Olympic silver medalist (1936) (born 1916)
 April 14 — Chet Aubuchon, American BAA player (Detroit Falcons) (born 1916)
 April 18 — Clarence Gaines, Basketball Hall of Fame coach (born 1923)
 May 1 — George Mikan, Basketball Hall of Fame player (born 1924)
 June 4 — Banks McFadden, American college coach (Clemson Tigers) (born 1917)
 June 29 — Marc Freiberger, American Olympic gold medalist (1952) (born 1928)
 August 4 — Sue Gunter, women's coach for Louisiana State University for 22 seasons (born 1939)
 August 16 — Aleksandr Gomelsky, Basketball Hall of Fame coach (born 1928)
 August 18 — Kenyon Jones, American player (born 1977)
 August 25 — Teo Cruz, Puerto Rican BSN player, five-time Olympian (born 1942)
 September 5 — Hank Anderson, American college coach (Gonzaga, Montana State) (born 1920)
 September 22 — Lee Huber, American NBL player (Akron Goodyear Wingfoots) (born 1919)
 September 26 — Shawntinice Polk, Arizona Wildcats women's player (born 1983)
 October 12 — Erwin Graf, American NBL player (Sheboygan Red Skins) (born 1917)
 October 15 — Jason Collier, Atlanta Hawks center (born 1977)
 November 23 — Nate Hawthorne, NBA player (Los Angeles Lakers, Phoenix Suns) (born 1951)
 December 18 — Bill Coulthard, Canadian Olympic player (1952) (born 1923)
 December 27 — Giancarlo Primo, Italian coach and FIBA Hall of Fame member (born 1924)

See also
 Timeline of women's basketball

References

External links